The federal city of Bonn ( is a city on the banks of the Rhine located in the German state of North Rhine-Westphalia, with a population of over 300,000. It is a university city, was the birthplace of Ludwig van Beethoven and was the capital of West Germany from 1949 to 1990. Bonn was the seat of government of reunited Germany from 1990 to 1999.

Founded in the 1st century BC as a Roman settlement in the province Germania Inferior, Bonn is one of Germany's oldest cities. It was the capital city of the Electorate of Cologne from 1597 to 1794, residence of the Archbishops and Prince-electors of Cologne. From 1949 to 1990, Bonn was the capital of West Germany, and Germany's present constitution, the Basic Law, was declared in the city in 1949. The era when Bonn served as the capital of West Germany is referred to by historians as the Bonn Republic.

Due to a political compromise (Berlin-Bonn Act) following the reunification, the German federal government maintains a substantial presence in Bonn. Roughly a third of all ministerial jobs are located in Bonn , and the city is considered a second, unofficial, capital of the country. Bonn is the secondary seat of the President, the Chancellor, and the Bundesrat, and the primary seat of six federal government ministries and twenty federal authorities. The title of Federal City reflects its important political status within Germany.

The headquarters of Deutsche Post DHL and Deutsche Telekom, both DAX-listed corporations, are in Bonn. The city is home to the University of Bonn and a total of 20 United Nations institutions, the highest number in all of Germany. These institutions include the headquarters for Secretariat of the UN Framework Convention Climate Change (UNFCCC), the Secretariat of the UN Convention to Combat Desertification (UNCCD), and the UN Volunteers programme.

Geography

Topography
Situated in the southernmost part of the Rhine-Ruhr region, Germany's largest metropolitan area with over 11 million inhabitants, Bonn lies within the German state of North Rhine-Westphalia, on the border with Rhineland-Palatinate. Spanning an area of more  on both sides of the river Rhine, almost three-quarters of the city lies on the river's left bank.

To the south and to the west, Bonn borders the Eifel region which encompasses the Rhineland Nature Park. To the north, Bonn borders the Cologne Lowland. Natural borders are constituted by the river Sieg to the north-east and by the Siebengebirge (also known as the Seven Hills) to the east. The geographical centre of Bonn is the Bundeskanzlerplatz (Chancellor Square) in Bonn-Gronau.

Administration 
The German state of North Rhine-Westphalia is divided into five governmental districts, and Bonn is part of the governmental district of Cologne. Within this governmental district, the city of Bonn is an urban district in its own right. The urban district of Bonn is then again divided into four administrative municipal districts. These are Bonn, Bonn-Bad Godesberg, Bonn-Beuel and Bonn-Hardtberg.
In 1969, the independent towns of Bad Godesberg and Beuel as well as several villages were incorporated into Bonn, resulting in a city more than twice as large as before.

Climate 

Bonn has an oceanic climate (Cfb). In the south of the Cologne lowland in the Rhine valley, Bonn is in one of Germany's warmest regions.

History

Founding and Roman period

The history of the city dates back to Roman times. In about 12 BC, the Roman army appears to have stationed a small unit in what is presently the historical centre of the city. Even earlier, the army had resettled members of a Germanic tribal group allied with Rome, the Ubii, in Bonn. The Latin name for that settlement, "Bonna", may stem from the original population of this and many other settlements in the area, the Eburoni. The Eburoni were members of a large tribal coalition effectively wiped out during the final phase of Caesar's War in Gaul. After several decades, the army gave up the small camp linked to the Ubii-settlement. During the 1st century AD, the army then chose a site to the north of the emerging town in what is now the section of Bonn-Castell to build a large military installation dubbed Castra Bonnensis, i.e., literally, "Fort Bonn". Initially built from wood, the fort was eventually rebuilt in stone. With additions, changes and new construction, the fort remained in use by the army into the waning days of the Western Roman Empire, possibly the mid-5th century. The structures themselves remained standing well into the Middle Ages, when they were called the Bonnburg. They were used by Frankish kings until they fell into disuse. Eventually, much of the building materials seem to have been re-used in the construction of Bonn's 13th-century city wall. The  (star gate) in the city center is a reconstruction using the last remnants of the medieval city wall.

To date, Bonn's Roman fort remains the largest fort of its type known from the ancient world, i.e. a fort built to accommodate a full-strength Imperial Legion and its auxiliaries. Between its walls it contained a dense grid of streets and a multitude of buildings, ranging from spacious headquarters and large officers' quarters to barracks, stables and a military jail. Among the legions stationed in Bonn, the "1st", i.e. the Prima Legio Minervia, seems to have served here the longest. Units of the Bonn legion were deployed to theatres of war ranging from modern-day Algeria to what is now the Russian republic of Chechnya.

The chief Roman road linking the provincial capitals of Cologne and Mainz cut right through the fort where it joined the fort's main road (now, Römerstraße). Once past the South Gate, the Cologne–Mainz road continued along what are now streets named Belderberg, Adenauerallee et al. On both sides of the road, the local settlement, Bonna, grew into a sizeable Roman town. Bonn is shown on the 4th century Peutinger Map.

In late antiquity, much of the town seems to have been destroyed by marauding invaders. The remaining civilian population then took refuge inside the fort along with the remnants of the troops stationed here. During the final decades of Imperial rule, the troops were supplied by Franci chieftains employed by the Roman administration. When the end came, these troops simply shifted their allegiances to the new barbarian rulers, the Kingdom of the Franks. From the fort, the Bonnburg, as well as from a new medieval settlement to the South centered around what later became the minster, grew the medieval city of Bonn. Local legends arose from this period that the name of the village came from Saint Boniface via Vulgar Latin *Bonnifatia, but this proved to be a myth.

Middle ages and early modern period 

Between the 11th and 13th centuries, the Romanesque style Bonn Minster was built, and in 1597 Bonn became the seat of the Archdiocese of Cologne. The city gained more influence and grew considerably. The city was subject to a major bombardment during the Siege of Bonn in 1689. Bonn was then returned to Cologne where it remained the capital at the Peace of Ryswick. The elector Clemens August (ruled 1723–1761) ordered the construction of a series of Baroque buildings which still give the city its character. Another memorable ruler was Max Franz (ruled 1784–1794), who founded the university and the spa quarter of Bad Godesberg. In addition he was a patron of the young Ludwig van Beethoven, who was born in Bonn in 1770; the elector financed the composer's first journey to Vienna.

In 1794, the city was seized by French troops, becoming a part of the First French Empire. In 1815 following the Napoleonic Wars, Bonn became part of the Kingdom of Prussia. Administered within the Prussian Rhine Province, the city became part of the German Empire in 1871 during the Prussian-led unification of Germany. Bonn was of little relevance in these years.

20th century and the "Bonn Republic"

During the Second World War, Bonn acquired military significance because of its strategic location on the Rhine, which formed a natural barrier to easy penetration into the German heartland from the west. The Allied ground advance into Germany reached Bonn on 7 March 1945, and the US 1st Infantry Division captured the city during the battle of 8–9 March 1945.

After the Second World War, Bonn was in the British zone of occupation. Following the advocacy of West Germany's first chancellor, Konrad Adenauer, a former Cologne Mayor and a native of that area, Bonn became the de facto capital, officially designated the "temporary seat of the Federal institutions," of the newly formed Federal Republic of Germany in 1949. However, the Bundestag, seated in Bonn's Bundeshaus, affirmed Berlin's status as the German capital. Bonn was chosen as the provisional capital and seat of government despite the fact that Frankfurt already had most of the required facilities and using Bonn was estimated to be 95 million DM more expensive than using Frankfurt. Bonn was chosen because Adenauer and other prominent politicians intended to make Berlin the capital of the reunified Germany, and they felt that locating the capital in a major city like Frankfurt or Hamburg would imply a permanent capital and even weaken support in West Germany for reunification.

In 1949, the Parliamentary Council in Bonn drafted and adopted the current German constitution, the Basic Law for the Federal Republic of Germany. As the political centre of West Germany, Bonn saw six Chancellors and six Presidents of the Federal Republic of Germany. Bonn's time as the capital of West Germany is commonly referred to as the Bonn Republic, in contrast to the Berlin Republic which followed reunification in 1990.

After national reunification

German reunification in 1990 made Berlin the nominal capital of Germany again. This decision, however, did not mandate that the republic's political institutions would also move. While some argued for the seat of government to move to Berlin, others advocated leaving it in Bonn – a situation roughly analogous to that of the Netherlands, where Amsterdam is the capital but The Hague is the seat of government. Berlin's previous history as united Germany's capital was strongly connected with the German Empire, the Weimar Republic and more ominously with both Nazi Germany and Prussia. It was felt that a new peacefully united Germany should not be governed from a city connected to such overtones of war. Additionally, Bonn was closer to Brussels, headquarters of the European Economic Community. Former West German chancellor and mayor of West Berlin Willy Brandt caused considerable offence to the Western Allies during the debate by stating that France would not have kept the seat of government at Vichy after Liberation.

The heated debate that resulted was settled by the Bundestag (Germany's parliament) only on 20 June 1991. By a vote of 338–320, the Bundestag voted to move the seat of government to Berlin. The vote broke largely along regional lines, with legislators from the south and west favouring Bonn and legislators from the north and east voting for Berlin. It also broke along generational lines as well; older legislators with memories of Berlin's past glory favoured Berlin, while younger legislators favoured Bonn. Ultimately, the votes of the eastern German legislators tipped the balance in favour of Berlin.

From 1990 to 1999, Bonn served as the seat of government of reunited Germany. In recognition of its former status as German capital, it holds the name of Federal City. Bonn currently shares the status of Germany's seat of government with Berlin, with the President, the Chancellor and many government ministries (such as Food & Agriculture and Defence) maintaining large presences in Bonn. Over 8,000 of the 18,000 federal officials remain in Bonn. A total of 19 United Nations (UN) institutions operate from Bonn today.

Politics and government

Mayor 

The current Mayor of Bonn is Katja Dörner of Alliance 90/The Greens since 2020. She defeated incumbent mayor Ashok-Alexander Sridharan in the most recent mayoral election, which was held on 13 September 2020, with a runoff held on 27 September. The results were as follows:

! rowspan=2 colspan=2| Candidate
! rowspan=2| Party
! colspan=2| First round
! colspan=2| Second round
|-
! Votes
! %
! Votes
! %
|-
| bgcolor=| 
| align=left| Ashok-Alexander Sridharan
| align=left| Christian Democratic Union
| 48,454
| 34.5
| 52,762
| 43.7
|-
| bgcolor=| 
| align=left| Katja Dörner
| align=left| Alliance 90/The Greens
| 38,793
| 27.6
| 67,880
| 56.3
|-
| bgcolor=| 
| align=left| Lissi von Bülow
| align=left| Social Democratic Party
| 28,389
| 20.2
|-
| 
| align=left| Christoph Artur Manka
| align=left| Citizens' League Bonn
| 8,694
| 6.2
|-
| bgcolor=| 
| align=left| Michael Faber
| align=left| The Left
| 7,032
| 5.0
|-
| bgcolor=| 
| align=left| Werner Hümmrich
| align=left| Free Democratic Party
| 4,853
| 3.5
|-
| bgcolor=| 
| align=left| Frank Rudolf Christian Findeiß
| align=left| Die PARTEI
| 2,873
| 2.0
|-
| 
| align=left| Kaisa Ilunga
| align=left| Alliance for Innovation and Justice
| 1,507
| 1.1
|-
! colspan=3| Valid votes
! 140,595
! 99.1
! 120,642
! 99.5
|-
! colspan=3| Invalid votes
! 1,219
! 0.9
! 627
! 0.5
|-
! colspan=3| Total
! 141,814
! 100.0
! 121,269
! 100.0
|-
! colspan=3| Electorate/voter turnout
! 249,091
! 56.9
! 249,098
! 48.7
|-
| colspan=7| Source: State Returning Officer
|}

City council 

The Bonn city council governs the city alongside the Mayor. It used to be based in the Rococo-style  (old city hall), built in 1737, located adjacent to Bonn's central market square. However, due to the enlargement of Bonn in 1969 through the incorporation of Beuel and Bad Godesberg, it moved into the larger Stadthaus facilities further north. This was necessary for the city council to accommodate an increased number of representatives.

The most recent city council election was held on 13 September 2020, and the results were as follows:

! colspan=2| Party
! Votes
! %
! +/-
! Seats
! +/-
|-
| bgcolor=| 
| align=left| Alliance 90/The Greens (Grüne)
| 39,311
| 27.9
|  9.2
| 19
|  3
|-
| bgcolor=| 
| align=left| Christian Democratic Union (CDU)
| 36,315
| 25.7
|  4.7
| 17
|  10
|-
| bgcolor=| 
| align=left| Social Democratic Party (SPD)
| 21,956
| 15.6
|  7.9
| 11
|  9
|-
| 
| align=left| Citizens' League Bonn (BBB)
| 9,948
| 7.1
|  2.0
| 5
|  1
|-
| bgcolor=| 
| align=left| The Left (Die Linke)
| 8,745
| 6.2
|  0.0
| 4
|  1
|-
| bgcolor=| 
| align=left| Free Democratic Party (FDP)
| 7,268
| 5.2
|  3.0
| 3
|  4
|-
| bgcolor=| 
| align=left| Volt Germany (Volt)
| 7,148
| 5.1
| New
| 3
| New
|-
| bgcolor=| 
| align=left| Alternative for Germany (AfD)
| 4,569
| 3.2
|  0.4
| 2
|  1
|-
| bgcolor=| 
| align=left| Die PARTEI (PARTEI)
| 3,095
| 2.2
| New
| 1
| New
|-
| 
| align=left| Alliance for Innovation and Justice (BIG)
| 1,775
| 1.3
|  0.2
| 1
| ±0
|-
| colspan=7 bgcolor=lightgrey| 
|-
| bgcolor=| 
| align=left| Pirate Party Germany (Piraten)
| 869
| 0.6
|  1.6
| 0
|  2
|-
| bgcolor=| 
| align=left| Independents
| 101
| 0.1
| –
| 0
| –
|-
! colspan=2| Valid votes
! 141,100
! 99.3
! 
! 
! 
|-
! colspan=2| Invalid votes
! 1,052
! 0.7
! 
! 
! 
|-
! colspan=2| Total
! 142,152
! 100.0
! 
! 66
!  20
|-
! colspan=2| Electorate/voter turnout
! 249,091
! 57.1
!  0.3
! 
! 
|-
| colspan=7| Source: State Returning Officer
|}

Land government 
Four delegates represent the Federal city of Bonn in the Landtag of North Rhine-Westphalia. The last election took place in May 2017. The current delegates are Guido Déus (CDU), Christos Katzidis (CDU), Joachim Stamp (FDP) and Franziska Müller-Rech (FDP).

Federal government 
Bonn's constituency is called  (096). In the German federal election 2017, Ulrich Kelber (SPD) was elected a member of German Federal parliament, the Bundestag by direct mandate. It is his fifth term. Katja Dörner representing Bündnis 90/Die Grünen and Alexander Graf Lambsdorff for FDP were elected as well. Kelber resigned in 2019 because he was appointed Federal Commissioner for Data Protection and Freedom of Information. As Dörner was elected Lord Mayor of Bonn in September 2020, she resigned as a member of parliament after her entry into office.

Culture 
Beethoven's birthplace is located in Bonngasse near the market place. Next to the market place is the Old City Hall, built in 1737 in Rococo style, under the rule of Clemens August of Bavaria. It is used for receptions of guests of the city, and as an office for the mayor. Nearby is the Kurfürstliches Schloss, built as a residence for the prince-elector and now the main building of the University of Bonn. 

The Poppelsdorfer Allee is an avenue flanked by Chestnut trees which had the first horsecar of the city. It connects the Kurfürstliches Schloss with the Poppelsdorfer Schloss, a palace that was built as a resort for the prince-electors in the first half of the 18th century, and whose grounds are now a botanical garden (the Botanischer Garten Bonn). This axis is interrupted by a railway line and Bonn Hauptbahnhof, a building erected in 1883/84.

The Beethoven Monument stands on the Münsterplatz, which is flanked by the Bonn Minster, one of Germany's oldest churches.

The three highest structures in the city are the WDR radio mast in Bonn-Venusberg, the headquarters of the Deutsche Post called Post Tower and the former building for the German members of parliament Langer Eugen now the location of the UN Campus.

Churches
 Bonn Minster
 Doppelkirche Schwarzrheindorf built in 1151
 Old Cemetery Bonn (Alter Friedhof), one of the best known cemeteries in Germany
 , built in 1627 with Johann Balthasar Neumann's Heilige Stiege, it is a stairway for Christian pilgrims
 St. Remigius, where Beethoven was baptized

Castles and residences
 Godesburg fortress ruins

Modern buildings

 Beethovenhalle
 Bundesviertel (federal quarter) with many government structures including
 Post Tower, the tallest building in the state North Rhine-Westphalia, housing the headquarters of Deutsche Post/DHL
 Maritim Bonn, five-star hotel and convention centre
 Schürmann-Bau, headquarters of Deutsche Welle
 Langer Eugen, since 2006 the centre of the United Nations Campus, formerly housing the offices of the members of the German parliament
 Deutsche Telekom headquarters
 T-Mobile headquarters
 Kameha Grand, five-star hotel

Museums

Just as Bonn's other four major museums, the Haus der Geschichte or Museum of the History of the Federal Republic of Germany, is located on the so-called Museumsmeile ("Museum Mile"). The Haus der Geschichte is one of the foremost German museums of contemporary German history, with branches in Berlin and Leipzig. In its permanent exhibition, the Haus der Geschichte presents German history from 1945 until the present, also shedding light on Bonn's own role as former capital of West Germany. Numerous temporary exhibitions emphasize different features, such as Nazism or important personalities in German history.

The Kunstmuseum Bonn or Bonn Museum of Modern Art is an art museum founded in 1947. The Kunstmuseum exhibits both temporary exhibitions and its permanent collection. The latter is focused on Rhenish Expressionism and post-war German art. German artists on display include Georg Baselitz, Joseph Beuys, Hanne Darboven, Anselm Kiefer, Blinky Palermo and Wolf Vostell. The museum owns one of the largest collections of artwork by Expressionist painter August Macke. His work is also on display in the August-Macke-Haus, located in Macke's former home where he lived from 1911 to 1914.
 
The Bundeskunsthalle (full name: Kunst- und Ausstellungshalle der Bundesrepublik Deutschland or Art and Exhibition Hall of the Federal Republic of Germany), focuses on the crossroads of culture, arts, and science. To date, it attracted more than 17 million visitors. One of its main objectives is to show the cultural heritage outside of Germany or Europe. Next to its changing exhibitions, the Bundeskunsthalle regularly hosts concerts, discussion panels, congresses, and lectures.

The Museum Koenig is Bonn's natural history museum. Affiliated with the University of Bonn, it is also a zoological research institution housing the Leibniz-Institut für Biodiversität der Tiere. Politically interesting, it is on the premises of the Museum Koenig where the Parlamentarischer Rat first met. The Deutsches Museum Bonn, affiliated with one of the world's foremost science museums, the Deutsches Museum in Munich, is an interactive science museum focusing on post-war German scientists, engineers, and inventions. Other museums include the Beethoven House, birthplace of Ludwig van Beethoven, the Rheinisches Landesmuseum Bonn (Rhinish Regional Museum Bonn), the Bonn Women's Museum, the Rheinisches Malermuseum and the Arithmeum.

Nature

There are several parks, leisure and protected areas in and around Bonn. The  is Bonn's most important leisure park, with its role being comparable to what Central Park is for New York City. It lies on the banks of the Rhine and is the city's biggest park intra muros. The Rhine promenade and the Alter Zoll (Old Toll Station) are in direct neighbourhood of the city centre and are popular amongst both residents and visitors. The Arboretum Park Härle is an arboretum with specimens dating to back to 1870. The Botanischer Garten (Botanical Garden) is affiliated with the university and it is here where Titan arum set a world record. The natural reserve of Kottenforst is a large area of protected woods on the hills west of the city centre.

In the very south of the city, on the border with Wachtberg and Rhineland-Palatinate, there is an extinct volcano, the Rodderberg, featuring a popular area for hikes. Also south of the city, there is the Siebengebirge which is part of the lower half of the Middle Rhine region. The nearby upper half of the Middle Rhine from Bingen to Koblenz is a UNESCO World Heritage Site with more than 40 castles and fortresses from the Middle Ages and important German vineyards.

Transportation

Air traffic 

With around 10.3 million passengers passing through it in 2015, it is the seventh-largest passenger airport in Germany and the third-largest in terms of cargo operations. By traffic units, which combines cargo and passengers, the airport is in fifth position in Germany. As of March 2015, Cologne Bonn Airport had services to 115 passenger destinations in 35 countries. The airport is one of Germany's few 24-hour airports, and is a hub for Eurowings and cargo operators FedEx Express and UPS Airlines.

The federal motorway (Autobahn) A59 connects the airport with the city. Long distance and regional trains to and from the airport stop at Cologne/Bonn Airport station. Another major airport within a one-hour drive by car is Düsseldorf International Airport.

Rail and bus system 

Bonn's central railway station, Bonn Hauptbahnhof is the city's main public transportation hub. It lies just outside the old town and near the central university buildings. It is served by regional (S-Bahn and Regionalbahn) and long-distance (IC and ICE) trains. Daily, more than 67,000 people travel via Bonn Hauptbahnhof. In late 2016, around 80 long distance and more than 165 regional trains departed to or from Bonn every day. Another long-distance station, (Siegburg/Bonn), is located in the nearby town of Siegburg and serves as Bonn's station on the high-speed rail line between Cologne and Frankfurt, offering faster connections to Southern Germany. It can be reached by Stadtbahn line 66 (approx. 25 minutes from central Bonn).

Bonn has a Stadtbahn light rail and a tram system. The Bonn Stadtbahn has 4 regular lines that connect the main north–south axis (centre to Bad Godesberg) and quarters east of the Rhine (Beuel and Oberkassel), as well as many nearby towns like Brühl, Wesseling, Sankt Augustin, Siegburg, Königswinter, and Bad Honnef. All lines serve the Central Station and two lines continue to Cologne, where they connect to the Cologne Stadtbahn. The Bonn tram system consists of two lines that connect closer quarters in the south, north and east of Bonn to the Central Station. While the Stadtbahn mostly has its own right-of-way, the tram often operates on general road lanes. A few sections of track are used by both systems. These urban rail lines are supplemented by a bus system of roughly 30 regular lines, especially since some parts of the city like Hardtberg and most of Bad Godesberg completely lack a Stadtbahn/Tram connection. Several lines offer night services, especially during the weekends. Bonn is part of the Verkehrsverbund Rhein-Sieg (Rhine-Sieg Transport Association) which is the public transport association covering the area of the Cologne/Bonn Region.

Road network 

Four Autobahns run through or are adjacent to Bonn: the A59 (right bank of the Rhine, connecting Bonn with Düsseldorf and Duisburg), the A555 (left bank of the Rhine, connecting Bonn with Cologne), the A562 (connecting the right with the left bank of the Rhine south of Bonn), and the A565 (connecting the A59 and the A555 with the A61 to the southwest). Three Bundesstraßen, which have a general  speed limit in contrast to the Autobahn, connect Bonn to its immediate surroundings (Bundesstraßen B9, B42 and B56).

With Bonn being divided into two parts by the Rhine, three bridges are crucial for inner-city road traffic: the Konrad-Adenauer-Brücke (A562) in the South, the Friedrich-Ebert-Brücke (A565) in the North, and the Kennedybrücke (B56) in the Centre. In addition, regular ferries operate between Bonn-Mehlem and Königswinter, Bonn-Bad Godesberg and Königswinter-Niederdollendorf, and Bonn-Graurheindorf and Niederkassel-Mondorf.

Port 
Located in the northern sub-district of Graurheindorf, the inland harbour of Bonn is used for container traffic as well as oversea transport. Regular passenger transport occurs to Cologne and Düsseldorf.

Economy

The head offices of Deutsche Telekom, its subsidiary T-Mobile, Deutsche Post, German Academic Exchange Service, and SolarWorld are in Bonn.

The third largest employer in the city of Bonn is the University of Bonn (including the university clinics) and Stadtwerke Bonn also follows as a major employer.

On the other hand, there are several traditional, nationally known private companies in Bonn such as luxury food producers Verpoorten and Kessko, the Klais organ manufacture and the Bonn flag factory.

The largest confectionery manufacturer in Europe, Haribo, has its founding headquarters (founded in 1922) and a production site in Bonn. Today the company is located in the Rhineland-Palatinate municipality of Grafschaft.

Other companies of supraregional importance are Weck Glaswerke (production site), Fairtrade, Eaton Industries (formerly Klöckner & Moeller), IVG Immobilien, Kautex Textron, SolarWorld, Vapiano and the SER Group.

Education

The Rheinische Friedrich Wilhelms Universität Bonn (University of Bonn) is one of the largest universities in Germany. It is also the location of the German research institute Deutsche Forschungsgemeinschaft (DFG) offices and of the German Academic Exchange Service (Deutscher Akademischer Austauschdienst – DAAD).

Private schools
 Aloisiuskolleg, a Jesuit private school in Bad Godesberg with boarding facilities
 Amos-Comenius-Gymnasium, a Protestant private school in Bad Godesberg
 Bonn International School (BIS), a private English-speaking school set in the former American Compound in the Rheinaue, which offers places from kindergarten to 12th grade. It follows the curriculum of the International Baccalaureate.
 Libysch Schule, private Arabic high school
 Independent Bonn International School, (IBIS) private primary school (serving from kindergarten, reception, and years 1 to 6)
 École de Gaulle - Adenauer, private French-speaking school serving grades pre-school ("maternelle") to grade 4 (CM1)
 Kardinal-Frings-Gymnasium (KFG), private catholic school of the Archdiocese of Cologne in Beuel
 Liebfrauenschule (LFS), private catholic school of the Archdiocese of Cologne 
 , private catholic school of the Archdiocese of Cologne in Beuel
 , private Catholic school of the Archdiocese of Cologne in Bad Godesberg
 , private boarding and day school in Oberkassel
  ("PÄDA"), private day school in Bad Godesberg
  ("CoJoBo"), private catholic day school
 Akademie für Internationale Bildung, private higher educational facility offering programs for international students
 Former schools
 King Fahd Academy, private Islamic school in Bad Godesberg

Demographics

, Bonn had a population of 327,913.  About 70% of the population was entirely of German origin, while about 100,000 people, equating to roughly 30%, were at least partly of non-German origin. The city is one of the fastest-growing municipalities in Germany and the 18th most populous city in the country. Bonn's population is predicted to surpass the populations of Wuppertal and Bochum before the year 2030.

The following list shows the largest groups of origin of minorites with "migration background" in Bonn .

Sports
Bonn is home of the Telekom Baskets Bonn, the only basketball club in Germany that owns its arena, the Telekom Dome. The club is a regular participant at international competitions such as the Basketball Champions League.

The city also has a semi-professional football team Bonner SC which was formed in 1965 through the merger of Bonner FV and Tura Bonn. The Bonn Gamecocks American football team play at the 12,000-capacity Stadion Pennenfeld.

The headquarters of the International Paralympic Committee has been located in Bonn since 1999.

The successful German Baseball Team Bonn Capitals are also found in the city of Bonn.

International relations

Since 1983, the City of Bonn has established friendship relations with the City of Tel Aviv, Israel, and since 1988 Bonn, in former times the residence of the Princes Electors of Cologne, and Potsdam, Germany, the formerly most important residential city of the Prussian rulers, have established a city-to-city partnership.

Central Bonn is surrounded by a number of traditional towns and villages which were independent up to several decades ago. As many of those communities had already established their own contacts and partnerships before the regional and local reorganisation in 1969, the Federal City of Bonn now has a dense network of city district partnerships with European partner towns.

The city district of Bonn is a partner of the English university city of Oxford, England, UK (since 1947), of Budafok, District XXII of Budapest, Hungary (since 1991) and of Opole, Poland (officially since 1997; contacts were established 1954).

The district of Bad Godesberg has established partnerships with Saint-Cloud in France, Frascati in Italy, Windsor and Maidenhead in England, UK and Kortrijk in Belgium; a friendship agreement has been signed with the town of Yalova, Turkey.

The district of Beuel on the right bank of the Rhine and the city district of Hardtberg foster partnerships with towns in France: Mirecourt and Villemomble.

Moreover, the city of Bonn has developed a concept of international co-operation and maintains sustainability oriented project partnerships in addition to traditional city twinning, among others with Minsk in Belarus, Ulaanbaatar in Mongolia, Bukhara in Uzbekistan, Chengdu in China and La Paz in Bolivia.

Twin towns – sister cities
Bonn is twinned with:

 Bukhara, Uzbekistan (1999)
 Cape Coast, Ghana (2012)
 Chengdu, China (2009)
 Minsk, Belarus (1993)
 La Paz, Bolivia (1996)
 Potsdam, Germany (1988)

 Tel Aviv, Israel (1983)
 Ulaanbaatar, Mongolia (1993)

Bonn city district is twinned with:
 Oxford, United Kingdom (1947)
 Budafok-Tétény (Budapest), Hungary (1991)

For twin towns of other city districts, see Bad Godesberg, Beuel and Hardtberg.

Notable people

Pre–20th century 

 Johann Peter Salomon (1745–1815), musician
 Franz Anton Ries (1755–1846), violinist and violin teacher
 Ludwig van Beethoven (1770–1827), composer
 Salomon Oppenheim, Jr. (1772–1828), banker
 Peter Joseph Lenné (1789–1866), gardener and landscape architect
 Friedrich von Gerolt (1797–1879), diplomat
 Karl Joseph Simrock (1802–1876), writer and specialist in German
 Wilhelm Neuland (1806–1889), composer and conductor
 Johanna Kinkel (1810–1858), composer and writer
 Moses Hess (1812–1875), philosopher and writer
 Johann Gottfried Kinkel (1815–1882), theologian, writer, and politician 
 Alexander Kaufmann (1817–1893), author and archivist
 Leopold Kaufmann (1821–1898), mayor
 Julius von Haast (1822–1887), New Zealand, professor of geology
 Dietrich Brandis (1824–1907), botanist
 Balduin Möllhausen (1825–1905), traveler and writer
 Maurus Wolter (1825–1890), Benedictine, founder and first abbot of the Abbey of Beuron and Beuronese Congregation
 August Reifferscheid (1835–1887), philologist
 Antonius Maria Bodewig (1839–1915), Jesuit missionary and founder
 Nathan Zuntz (1847–1920), physician
 Alexander Koenig (1858–1940), zoologist, founder of Museum Koenig in Bonn
 Alfred Philippson (1864–1953), geographer
 Johanna Elberskirchen (1864–1943), writer and activist
 Max Alsberg (1877–1933), lawyer
 Kurt Wolff (1887–1963), publisher
 Hans Riegel Sr. (1893–1945), entrepreneur
 Eduard Krebsbach (1894–1947), SS doctor in Nazi Mauthausen concentration camp, executed for war crimes
 Paul Kemp (1896–1953), actor

1900–1949 

 Hermann Josef Abs (1901–1994), board member of the Deutsche Bank
 Paul Ludwig Landsberg (1901–1944), in Sachsenhausen concentration camp, philosopher
 Heinrich Lützeler (1902–1988), philosopher, art historian, and literary scholar
 Helmut Horten (1909–1987), entrepreneur 
 Theodor Schieffer (1910–1992), historian and medievalist
 Irene Sänger-Bredt (1911–1983), mathematician and physicist
 Ernst Friedrich Schumacher (1911–1977), economist
 Klaus Barbie (1913–1991), Nazi SS and Gestapo war criminal, the "Butcher of Lyon"
 Karl-Theodor Molinari (1915–1993), General and founding chairman of the German Armed Forces Association
 Karlrobert Kreiten (1916–1943), pianist
 Hans Walter Zech-Nenntwich (born 1916), Second Polish Republic, SS Cavalry member and war criminal
 Walther Killy (1917–1985), German literary scholar, Der Killy
 Hannjo Hasse (1921–1983), actor
 Walter Gotell (1924–1997), actor
 Walter Eschweiler (born 1935), football referee
 Alexandra Cordes (1935–1986), writer
 Joachim Bißmeier (born 1936), actor
 Roswitha Esser (born 1941), canoeist, gold medal winner at the Olympic Games in 1964 and 1968, Sportswoman of the Year 1964
 Heide Simonis (born 1943), politician (SPD), former Prime Minister of Schleswig-Holstein, since 2005 honorary chairman of UNICEF Germany
 Paul Alger (born 1943), football player
 Johannes Mötsch (born 1949), archivist and historian 
 Klaus Ludwig (born 1949), race car driver

1950-1999 
 Günter Ollenschläger (born 1951), medical and science journalist
 Hans "Hannes" Bongartz (born 1951), football player and coach
 Christa Goetsch (born 1952), politician (Alliance '90 / The Greens)
 Michael Meert (born 1953), film author and director
 Thomas de Maizière (born 1954), politician (CDU), former Minister of Defense and of the Interior
 Gerd Faltings (born 1954), mathematician, Fields Medal winner
 Olaf Manthey (born 1955), former touring car racing driver
 Michael Kühnen (1955–1991), Neo-Nazi
 Roger Willemsen (1955–2016), publicist, author, essayist, and presenter
 Norman Rentrop (born 1957), publisher, author, and investor
 Markus Maria Profitlich (born 1960), comedian and actor
 Guido Westerwelle (1961–2016), politician (FDP), Foreign Minister and Vice Chancellor of Germany from 2009 to 2011
 Mathias Dopfner (born 1963), chief executive officer of Axel Springer AG
 Nikolaus Blome (born 1963), journalist
 Maxim Kontsevich (born 1964), mathematician, Fields Medal winner
 Johannes B. Kerner (born 1964), TV presenter, Abitur at the Aloisiuskolleg, and studied in Bonn
 Anthony Baffoe (born 1965), football player, sports presenter, and actor
 Sonja Zietlow (born 1968), TV presenter
 Burkhard Garweg (born 1968), member of the Red Army Faction
 Sabriye Tenberken (born 1970), Tibetologist, founder of Braille Without Borders
 Thorsten Libotte (born 1972), writer
 Tamara Gräfin von Nayhauß (born 1972), television presenter
 Silke Bodenbender (born 1974), actress
 Juli Zeh (born 1974), writer
 Oliver Mintzlaff (born 1975), track and field athlete and sports manager, CEO of RB Leipzig
 Markus Dieckmann (born 1976), beach volleyball player
 Bernadette Heerwagen (born 1977), actress
 Melanie Amann (born 1978), journalist
 Bushido (born 1978), musician and rapper
 Sebastian Stahl (born 1978), race car driver
 Sonja Fuss (born 1978), football player
DJ Manian DJ of Cascada (born 1978) owner of Zooland Records
 Andreas Tölzer (born 1980), judoka
 Jens Hartwig (born 1980), actor
 Natalie Horler (born 1981), front woman of the Dance Project Cascada
 Marcel Ndjeng (born 1982), football player
 Marc Zwiebler (born 1984), badminton player
 Benjamin Barg (born 1984), football player
 Alexandros Margaritis (born 1984), race car driver
 Ken Miyao (born 1986), pop singer
 Felix Reda (born 1986), politician
 Peter Scholze (born 1987), mathematician, Fields Medal winner
 Célia Okoyino da Mbabi (born 1988), football player
 Luke Mockridge (born 1989), comedian and author
 Pius Heinz (born 1989), poker player, 2011 WSOP Main Event champion
 Jonas Wohlfarth-Bottermann (born 1990), basketball player
 Levina (born 1991), singer
 Bienvenue Basala-Mazana (born 1992), football player
 Annika Beck (born 1994), tennis player
 James Hyndman (born 1962), stage actor
 Konstanze Klosterhalfen (born 1997), track and field athlete

21st century 

 Anny Ogrezeanu (born 2001), singer and The Voice of Germany winner 2022

References

Bibliography

External links

 Official website 
 Tourist information
 "The Museum Mile"
 Germany's Museum of Art in Bonn

 
Former national capitals
Populated places on the Rhine
Roman towns and cities in Germany
10s BC establishments in the Roman Empire
Roman legionary fortresses in Germany
Roman fortifications in Germania Inferior